Mill Creek is a stream in Thurston County, Washington. It is a tributary of Mima Creek.

Mill Creek was named for a sawmill along its course.

References

Rivers of Thurston County, Washington
Rivers of Washington (state)